Falls is an unincorporated community in Wyoming County, Pennsylvania, United States. Falls has a post office with ZIP code 18615.

References

Unincorporated communities in Wyoming County, Pennsylvania
Unincorporated communities in Pennsylvania